Sep. 11 - Eastern Orthodox Church Calendar - Sep. 13

All fixed commemorations below celebrated on September 25 by Orthodox Churches on the Old Calendar.

For September 12th, Orthodox Churches on the Old Calendar commemorate the Saints listed on August 30.

Feasts
 Apodosis of the Nativity of the Theotokos.

Saints
 Hieromartyr Coronatus, Bishop of Nicomedia at Iconium (249-259)
 Martyr Theodore of Alexandria.
 Martyr Oceanus.
 Hieromartyr Autonomus, Bishop, in Italy (313)
 Martyr Julian of Galatia and 40 martyrs with him (4th century)
 Martyrs Macedonius, Tatian, and Theodulus, in Phrygia (4th century)
 Venerable Daniel of Thasos, monk, of the island of Thasos (c. 843)
 Venerable Andronicus of Atroa, in Bithynia (9th century)

Pre-Schism Western saints
 Saint Juventius of Pavia, first Bishop of Pavia, Italy (1st century)  (see also: February 8)
 Saint Ailbhe of Emly (Albeus, Elvis), first Bishop of Emly, Ireland (527)
 Saint Silvinus, Bishop of Verona in Italy (c. 550)
 Saint Sacerdos of Lyon, Bishop of Lyon in Gaul (551)
 Saint Molaise of Devenish Island (563)
 Saint Eanswythe, Abbess, of Folkestone Priory (c. 640)
 Saint Guy of Anderlecht (Guido), called 'the Poor Man of Anderlecht', Confessor (c. 1012)

Post-Schism Orthodox saints
 Venerable Athanasius (1401), disciple of St. Sergius of Radonezh and first abbot of the Vysotsky Monastery in Serpukhov, and his disciple Venerable Athanasius (1395)
 Venerable Bassian of Tiksna in Vologda (1624-1633)
 Hieromartyr Dositheus, Metropolitan of Tbilisi, Georgia (1795)

New martyrs and confessors
 New Hieromartyrs Theodore Lebedev, John Prudentov, and Nicholas Zhitov, Priests (1937)
 New Martyr Alexis Voroshin, Fool-for-Christ, of Elnat and Zharki, near Kineshma (1937)

Other commemorations
 Commemoration of the vision and muting of Zechariah.
 Translation of the relics (1704) of Righteous Simeon of Verkhoturye (1642)

Icon gallery

Notes

References

Sources
 September 12/September 25. Orthodox Calendar (PRAVOSLAVIE.RU).
 September 25 / September 12. HOLY TRINITY RUSSIAN ORTHODOX CHURCH (A parish of the Patriarchate of Moscow).
 September 12. OCA - The Lives of the Saints.
 The Autonomous Orthodox Metropolia of Western Europe and the Americas (ROCOR). St. Hilarion Calendar of Saints for the year of our Lord 2004. St. Hilarion Press (Austin, TX). p. 68.
 The Twelfth Day of the Month of September. Orthodoxy in China.
 September 12. Latin Saints of the Orthodox Patriarchate of Rome.
 The Roman Martyrology. Transl. by the Archbishop of Baltimore. Last Edition, According to the Copy Printed at Rome in 1914. Revised Edition, with the Imprimatur of His Eminence Cardinal Gibbons. Baltimore: John Murphy Company, 1916. pp. 280–281.
 Rev. Richard Stanton. A Menology of England and Wales, or, Brief Memorials of the Ancient British and English Saints Arranged According to the Calendar, Together with the Martyrs of the 16th and 17th Centuries. London: Burns & Oates, 1892. p. 446.

 Greek Sources
 Great Synaxaristes:  12 ΣΕΠΤΕΜΒΡΙΟΥ. ΜΕΓΑΣ ΣΥΝΑΞΑΡΙΣΤΗΣ.
  Συναξαριστής. 12 Σεπτεμβρίου. ECCLESIA.GR. (H ΕΚΚΛΗΣΙΑ ΤΗΣ ΕΛΛΑΔΟΣ).
  12/09/. Ορθόδοξος Συναξαριστής.

 Russian Sources
  25 сентября (12 сентября). Православная Энциклопедия под редакцией Патриарха Московского и всея Руси Кирилла (электронная версия). (Orthodox Encyclopedia - Pravenc.ru).
  12 сентября по старому стилю  /  25 сентября по новому стилю. Русская Православная Церковь - Православный церковный календарь на  год.

September in the Eastern Orthodox calendar